Lucy Aldrich Rockefeller Waletzky (born 1941) is an American philanthropist and environmentalist. She is the third daughter of Laurance Spelman Rockefeller (1910–2004) and Mary French (1910–1997), and a fourth-generation member of the Rockefeller family. Waletzky served on the board of the Friends of the Rockefeller State Park Preserve from 1997 to 2006. She received the Governor's Parks and Preservation Award in 2004.

Family
Waletzky has two older sisters, Marion Rockefeller Weber and Laura Rockefeller Chasin, and a younger brother, Laurance Spelman Rockefeller Jr. Her patrilineal great-grandfather was Standard Oil's co-founder John D. Rockefeller and her matrilineal great-grandfather was Frederick H. Billings, a president of Northern Pacific Railway. Both of her grandmothers, Mary Billings French and Abby Aldrich Rockefeller, were important to the early development of YWCA USA.

Board memberships
Waletzky served on the board of the Friends of the Rockefeller State Park Preserve from 1997 to 2006. She received the Governor's Parks and Preservation Award in 2004.   Waletzky concentrated her attention on the bird and wildlife habitat in the park. She was interested in the preserving health of the forests, wetlands, meadows. and streams there.  From 1998 to 2004 Waletzky served as board member of the National Audubon Society.  Since March 2007 Waletzky has been the chair of the New York State Council of Parks, Recreation and Historic Preservation.

Philanthropy
In 2003 Waletzky donated  of land to New York state. She also donated  to Westchester County. The donations were intended to be used for parking at the North County Trail Way bike path, and possibly to establish a new headquarters building for the Westchester County Parks.

Awards
Waletzky received the Governor's Parks and Preservation Award in 2004.   She also was given both the State Council of Parks Commission Chair Award and Friends of Westchester County Parks Best Friend Award in 2006.

See also

Rockefeller family
Laurance Rockefeller

References

Rockefeller family
Winthrop family
American philanthropists
Living people
1941 births